Danny Chapman (born 21 November 1974) is a retired professional footballer who played in the football league with Millwall and Leyton Orient. Chapman played as a defensive central midfielder.

Playing career
Chapman started at Millwall but failed to earn first-team football on a regular basis, which led to his move to Leyton Orient. At Orient Chapman did get first-team football for two years, making 78 league appearances for the club, but was released in the summer of 1997. He moved into non-league football with Conference club Welling United. Chapman spent three years at Welling, but he left to join fellow Conference side Dover Athletic after Welling were relegated from the Conference in 2000. Chapman left Dover in March 2003 to join rival Folkestone Invicta, however he returned to Dover in the summer of 2003. After one season he left to join Eastbourne Borough. He returned to Dover after one season, where he was a losing finalist in two consecutive Isthmian League Division One play-offs. Chapman left Dover to join fellow Isthmian League Division One South side Cray Wanderers. In his first season with the club, Chapman again lost in the play-offs. The following season it was fourth time lucky as Cray Wanderers were promoted after winning the Isthmian League Division One South play-off final. This was Chapman's final match as he retired after it.

References

External links
 

Living people
1974 births
Footballers from Deptford
English footballers
Association football midfielders
Millwall F.C. players
Leyton Orient F.C. players
Welling United F.C. players
Eastbourne Borough F.C. players
Dover Athletic F.C. players
Folkestone Invicta F.C. players
Cray Wanderers F.C. players
English Football League players
National League (English football) players
Isthmian League players